Tong Ling (童玲) is a former female international table tennis player from China.

Table tennis career
From 1980 to 1985 she won many medals in singles, doubles, and team events in the Asian Table Tennis Championships and in the World Table Tennis Championships.

The eleven World Championship medals included four gold medals; one in the singles at the 1981 World Table Tennis Championships and three in the team event.

See also
 List of table tennis players
 List of World Table Tennis Championships medalists

References

Chinese female table tennis players
Living people
Asian Games medalists in table tennis
Table tennis players at the 1982 Asian Games
People from Zigong
Table tennis players from Sichuan
Medalists at the 1982 Asian Games
Asian Games gold medalists for China
Asian Games silver medalists for China
Year of birth missing (living people)